The OFC U-20 Championship 1985 was held in Sydney, Australia. It also served as qualification for the 1985 FIFA World Youth Championship.

Teams
The following teams entered the tournament:

  (host)

Matches

Qualification to World Youth Championship
The tournament winner qualified for the 1985 FIFA World Youth Championship.

External links
Results by RSSSF

1985
Under 20
1985
1985 in Australian soccer
1985 in New Zealand association football
1985 in Taiwanese football
1984–85 in Israeli football
1985 in youth association football